Adriatic derby is the name given to matches between two largest Croatian football clubs coming from the Adriatic coast, Hajduk Split and Rijeka. The teams are supported by their fanbases called Split's Torcida and Rijeka's Armada.

Games of note are the 1986–87 Yugoslav Cup final, when Hajduk won the cup, and the 2004–05 Croatian Football Cup final when Rijeka won the trophy. In the penultimate round of the 1998–99 Croatian First Football League season at Stadion Poljud, Rijeka won 3–1 and the entire stadium began to applaud the Rijeka footballers, including the Hajduk fans. This was unusual, especially for such big rivals. Another notable derby took place on 9 September 1962 in Rijeka. This game is noteworthy, or rather infamous, as numerous rocks collapsed off the cliff at Stadion Kantrida, in process injuring 96 supporters.

Due to various formats that were used in the Croatian championship and the cup competition format (which has teams playing two-legged fixtures even in the final game) and in addition to the games played in the Supercup, there has been anywhere from two to seven derbies per season. For example, as many as 14 derbies were played between March 2005 and November 2006. Due to Rijeka's absence from the Yugoslav First League no games have been played between 1947 and 1958, and 1969 and 1974, with the exception of a cup game in 1971.

Results

By competition

Last updated on 5 February 2023.

By ground

Last updated on 5 February 2023.

List of matches

Key

1946–1991

1992–present

Note: Home team's score always shown first

Top scorers
Updated up to the last derby played on 5 February 2023.

Hajduk Split
10 goals
 Mijo Caktaš

7 goals
 Zvonko Bego
 Zvonimir Deranja

6 goals
 Ivica Hlevnjak
 Marko Livaja
 Pero Nadoveza
 Zlatko Vujović

5 goals
 Ivan Gudelj

4 goals
 Andrija Anković
 Jurica Jerković
 Džemaludin Mušović
 Goran Vučević
 Jurica Vučko
 Ante Vukušić
 Slaviša Žungul

Rijeka
7 goals
 Anas Sharbini

5 goals
 Antonio Čolak
 Josip Drmić
 Admir Hasančić
 Mladen Mladenović
 Davor Vugrinec

4 goals
 Leon Benko
 Roman Bezjak
 Boško Bursać
 Janko Janković
 Andrej Kramarić
 Vladimir Lukarić

Players who have scored for both clubs in the derby
Filip Bradarić (2 goals, 1 for Hajduk and 1 for Rijeka)
Josip Elez (3 goals, 1 for Hajduk and 2 for Rijeka)
Tomislav Erceg (5 goals, 3 for Hajduk and 2 for Rijeka)
Nenad Gračan (2 goals, 1 for Hajduk and 1 for Rijeka)
Željko Mijač (3 goals, 2 for Hajduk and 1 for Rijeka)
Igor Musa (3 goals, 2 for Hajduk and 1 for Rijeka)

Players who have played for both clubs (senior career)

Franko Andrijašević
Boško Anić
Leonard Bisaku
Ivan Bošnjak
Filip Bradarić
Elvis Brajković
Josip Bulat
Nino Bule
Marijan Buljat
Boško Bursać
Vedran Celiščak
Sebastjan Cimirotič
Nikica Cukrov
Vladimir Ćutuk
Mate Dragičević
Josip Elez
Tomislav Erceg
Drago Gabrić
Tonči Gabrić
Marin Galić

Nenad Gračan
Janko Janković
Igor Jelavić
Ive Jerolimov
Dario Jertec
Petar Krpan
Mišo Krstičević
Rúben Lima
Siniša Linić
Vedran Madžar
Filip Marčić
Ivica Matković
Jozo Matošić
Mario Meštrović
Željko Mijač
Darko Miladin
Mladen Mladenović
Jasmin Mujdža
Igor Musa
Mato Neretljak

Zlatko Papec
Saša Peršon
Berislav Poldrugovac
Natko Rački
Josip Radošević
Krunoslav Rendulić
Ivan Rodić
Goran Rubil
Sead Seferović
Ahmad Sharbini
Anas Sharbini
Stjepan Skočibušić
Zoran Slavica
Lorenco Šimić
Marin Tomasov
Robert Vladislavić
Luka Vučko
Kazimir Vulić
Danijel Vušković
Miroslav Weiss

Managers who have worked at both clubs
Ljubo Benčić
Miroslav Blažević
Luka Bonačić
Nenad Gračan
Luka Kaliterna
Ivan Katalinić
Jozo Matošić
Josip Skoblar
Zoran Vulić

Yugoslav First League results

The tables list the place each team took in each of the seasons they played together in the top division.

Prva HNL results

The tables list the place each team took in each of the seasons.

See also
Eternal derby
Dinamo–Rijeka derby

References

External links
Archive of Hajduk's games at Hajduk.hr  
History of Rijeka's participation in championships at NK-Rijeka.hr  

HNK Hajduk Split
Football derbies in Croatia
derby